Synology Inc. is a Taiwanese corporation that specializes in network-attached storage (NAS) appliances. Synology's line of NAS is known as the DiskStation for desktop models, FlashStation for all-flash models, and RackStation for rack-mount models. Synology's products are distributed worldwide and localized in several languages.

Synology's headquarters are located in Taipei, Taiwan, with subsidiaries located around the world.

In 2018, product review website Wirecutter described Synology as a "longtime leader in the small-business and home NAS arena", albeit still a newcomer in the field of Wi-Fi routers.

Company history

Synology Inc. was founded in January 2000 when Cheen Liao and Philip Wong left Microsoft to pursue an independent project. Liao was a development manager in the Microsoft Exchange Server Group, while Wong was a Sales Director for Microsoft in Taiwan. The two began to write a new operating system called Filer OS based on Berkeley Software Distribution (BSD), which was to be used with Fastora NAS hardware to create a NAS solution. To integrate their NAS software tightly with hardware, Synology released its first complete solution in 2004, the DiskStation DS-101. Since then, Synology has grown to about 650 employees worldwide. Liao and Wong are still with the company, with Liao serving as President of Synology America Corp. and Wong serving Chairman of Synology Inc.

DSM extensibility
Synology's software architecture allows for third-party add-on application integration. Hundreds of third-party applications are available in addition to Synology's own catalog. Command line access via SSH or Telnet is available. Access to development tools and APIs are also available on Synology's website. Third-party applications can be written in an interpreted programming language such as PHP or compiled to binary format. Public APIs allow custom applications to integrate into Synology's web-based user interface. Installers using the SPK format can install third-party applications directly on the DSM operating system.

Vulnerabilities

In 2014, a piece of ransomware emerged, dubbed "Synolocker", that targeted Synology devices.

See also
 List of companies of Taiwan

References

External links
 
 

Computer storage companies
Electronics companies of Taiwan
Linux-based devices
Network-attached storage
Server appliance
Companies based in Taipei
Computer companies established in 2000
Taiwanese companies established in 2000
Taiwanese brands